Lake Heron is a freshwater lake in the South Island of New Zealand. It is drained by Lake Stream which in turn feeds into the Rakaia River.

Forest and Bird have expressed concern over the environmental impacts of new roading on the southern shore of the lake.

See also
List of lakes in New Zealand

References

External links

Department of Conservation - Vehicle access at Lake Heron

Lakes of Canterbury, New Zealand